Philip Arnold Blackmar (born September 22, 1957) is an American professional golfer. He played on the PGA Tour from 1985 to 2000 and on the Champions Tour from 2007 to 2012. He was the tallest player on the PGA Tour during his time on tour, standing 6'7".

Career
Blackmar was born in San Diego, California. He played college golf at the University of Texas where he was a three-time All-Southwest Conference selection. He graduated in 1979 with a degree in finance and turned pro in 1980.

Blackmar played on mini-tours for a few years before earning his 1985 PGA Tour card by finishing second at the 1984 qualifying school. He won three PGA Tour events, all in playoffs: 1985 Canon Sammy Davis Jr.-Greater Hartford Open, 1988 Provident Classic, and 1997 Shell Houston Open. He stopped playing the tour after the 2000 season and worked as an analyst and commentator for U.S. TV networks.

After turning 50 in September 2007, Blackmar began playing on the Champions Tour. He won his first Champions Tour event in 2009 at the AT&T Championship by one stroke over three players. He went 36 holes bogey-free over the weekend in San Antonio, Texas.

Professional wins (5)

PGA Tour wins (3)

PGA Tour playoff record (3–0)

Champions Tour wins (1)

Other wins (1)
this list is incomplete
1983 Missouri Open

Results in major championships

CUT = missed the half-way cut
"T" = tied

Summary

Most consecutive cuts made – 6 (1985 PGA – 1989 PGA)
Longest streak of top-10s – 1

Results in The Players Championship

CUT = missed the halfway cut
"T" indicates a tie for a place

See also
1984 PGA Tour Qualifying School graduates
1994 PGA Tour Qualifying School graduates

References

External links

American male golfers
Texas Longhorns men's golfers
PGA Tour golfers
PGA Tour Champions golfers
Golfers from San Diego
Sportspeople from Corpus Christi, Texas
1957 births
Living people